Jarvey or jarvie may refer to:

The driver of a jaunting car
Coachman, often referred to as a "jarvey" or "jarvie"

Literature 
The Jarvey (newspaper), a weekly comic newspaper edited by Percy French
The Adventure of the Laughing Jarvey, a Sherlock Holmes pastiche written by Stephen Fry

People
Jarvis (disambiguation), of which "Jarvey" can be a nickname
John Alfred Jarvey (born 1956), US federal judge
Ken Jarvey, a member of 764-HERO
Drew Jarvie (born 1948), Scottish footballer
Paul Jarvie (born 1982), Scottish footballer
Tom Jarvie (1916–2011), Scottish footballer
John Jervis, 1st Earl of St Vincent (1735–1823). was nicknamed "Old Jarvey"